1,3-Diisocyanatobenzene is an aromatic isocyanate with the chemical formula C8H4N2O2.

See also
 Toluene diisocyanate

References 

Benzene derivatives
Isocyanates